Tiber Dam, located in southern Liberty County in northern Montana, USA, is a dam on the Marias River which forms Lake Elwell, also known as Tiber Reservoir. Construction on the dam began in 1952 and it was complete in 1956. Between 1967 and 1969, a dike was added to the southern rim of the reservoir near the dam due to difficulties with the spillway settling. From 1976 to 1989, the spillway was rehabilitated.  The dam is also considered one of the biggest earth-fill dams in the world, along with Fort Peck Dam.

References

Dams in Montana
Buildings and structures in Liberty County, Montana
Earth-filled dams
United States Bureau of Reclamation dams
Dams completed in 1956